Kalanderpur is a village located in Mehanagar taluka of Azamgarh district of Uttar Pradesh.

Villages in Azamgarh district